The 1992 NCAA Men's Water Polo Championship was the 24th annual NCAA Men's Water Polo Championship to determine the national champion of NCAA men's collegiate water polo. Tournament matches were played at the Belmont Plaza Pool in Long Beach, California during December 1992.

California defeated rival Stanford in the final, 12–11 (in three overtimes), to win their eleventh, and third consecutive, national title. The undefeated Golden Bears (31–0) were coached by Steve Heaston.

The Most Outstanding Player of the tournament was Dirk Zeien from California. Zeien, along with six other players, was named to the All-Tournament Team.

The tournament's leading scorer, with 12 goals, was Danny Leyson from USC.

Qualification
Since there has only ever been one single national championship for water polo, all NCAA men's water polo programs (whether from Division I, Division II, or Division III) were eligible. A total of 8 teams were invited to contest this championship.

Bracket
Site: Belmont Plaza Pool, Long Beach, California

All-tournament team 
Dirk Zeien, California (Most outstanding player)
Troy Barnhart, California
Larry Bercutt, Stanford
Chip Blankenhorn, Stanford
Steve Gill, UC Irvine
Danny Leyson, USC
Chris Oeding, California

See also 
 NCAA Men's Water Polo Championship

References

NCAA Men's Water Polo Championship
NCAA Men's Water Polo Championship
1992 in sports in California
December 1992 sports events in the United States
1992